Rasheed Bhatti (born 2 May 1952) is a Pakistani former first-class cricketer who played for Lahore cricket team. Later he became an umpire and stood in matches in the 2005–06 ABN-AMRO Twenty-20 Cup.

References

External links
 

1952 births
Living people
Pakistani cricketers
Pakistani cricket umpires
Lahore cricketers
Cricketers from Lahore